George Ernest Young (Philadelphia, PA, 10 July 1937) is an American jazz saxophonist.

After leading his own band in the late 1950s, Young became a New York City session and studio musician in the 1960s and joined several line-ups including Mike Mainieri's jazz-rock big band White Elephant Orchestra, as well as later joining the Saturday Night Live Band.

In 1982, along with fellow saxophonists Dave Sanborn, Ronnie Cuber, Young was voted one of the Most Valued Players by the New York Chapter of the National Academy of Recording Arts & Sciences' annual awards edition.

Young has led his own quartets featuring Harold Danko, Rick Laird and Butch Miles (early 1980s) and another quartet, featuring Warren Bernhardt, Tony Marino and Tom Whaley (early 1990s).

Discography

As leader 

 1962: Presenting the Unbelieveable George Young, Columbia Records CS 8681
 1989: Old Times - Chiaroscuro Records CR(D) 307
 1994: Salute (with Louie Bellson and Bobby Shew) - Chiaroscuro Records CR(D) 329

As sideman/session musician 

 1974: James Taylor - Walking Man
 1976: Walter Murphy Band - A Fifth of Beethoven, Private Stock Records (Soprano, Alto, Tenor Sax, and Flute solos.)
 1977: Maynard Ferguson - Conquistador, Columbia Records
 1977: Walter Bishop Jr. - Soul Village, Muse
 1978: Quincy Jones - Sounds...and Stuff Like That!! 
 1979: Dr. John - City Lights,
 1979: Ian Hunter - You're Never Alone with a Schizophrenic, Chrysalis
 1984: Yoko Ono - Every Man Has a Woman, Polydor (Young plays on the track "Now or Never", recorded in 1972
 1996: Christy Baron - I Thought About You, Chesky

References 

1937 births
Living people
American jazz saxophonists
20th-century American saxophonists